The 1965 Calgary Stampeders finished in 1st place in the Western Conference of the Canadian Football League with a 12–4 record. They were defeated in the Western Finals by the Winnipeg Blue Bombers.

Regular season

Season standings

Season schedule

Playoffs

Conference finals

 Winnipeg wins the best of three series 2–1. The Blue Bombers will advance to the Grey Cup Championship game.

Awards and records

1965 CFL All-Stars

References

Calgary Stampeders seasons
1965 Canadian Football League season by team